Chenopodium is a genus of numerous species of perennial or annual herbaceous flowering plants known as the goosefoots, which occur almost anywhere in the world. It is placed in the family Amaranthaceae in the APG II system; older classification systems, notably the widely used Cronquist system, separate it and its relatives as Chenopodiaceae, but this leaves the rest of the Amaranthaceae polyphyletic. However, among the Amaranthaceae, the genus Chenopodium is the namesake member of the subfamily Chenopodioideae.

Description

The species of Chenopodium (s.str., description according to Fuentes et al. 2012) are annual or perennial herbs, shrubs or small trees. They generally rely on alkaline soil. They are nonaromatic, but sometimes fetid. The young stems and leaves are often densely covered by vesicular globose hairs, thus looking farinose. Characteristically, these trichomes persist, collapsing later and becoming cup-shaped.
The branched stems grow erect, ascending, prostrate or scrambling. Lateral branches are alternate (the lowermost ones can be nearly opposite). The alternate or opposite leaves are petiolate. Their thin or slightly fleshy leaf blade is linear, rhombic or triangular-hastate, with entire or dentate or lobed margins. 

Inflorescences are standing terminal and lateral. They consist of spicately or paniculately arranged glomerules of flowers. Plants are monoecious (rarely dioecious). In monoecious plants flowers are dimorphic or pistillate. Flowers consist of (4–) 5 perianth segments connate, basally or close to the middle, usually membranous margined and with a roundish to keeled back; almost always 5 stamens, and one ovary with 2 stigmas. 

In fruit, perianth segments become sometimes coloured, but mostly keep unchanged, somewhat closing over or spreading from the fruit. The pericarp is membranous or sometimes succulent, adherent to or loosely covering the seed. The horizontally oriented seeds are depressed-globular to lenticular, with rounded to subacute margin. The black seed coat is almost smooth to finely striate, rugulose or pitted.

Uses and human importance

The genus Chenopodium contains several plants of minor to moderate importance as food crops as leaf vegetables – used like the closely related spinach (Spinacia oleracea) and similar plants called quelite in Mexicoand pseudocereals. These include white goosefoot (C. album), kañiwa (C. pallidicaule) and quinoa (C. quinoa). On the Greek island of Crete, tender shoots and leaves of a species called krouvida (κρουβίδα) or psarovlito (ψαρόβλητο) are eaten by the locals, boiled or steamed. As studied by Bruce D. Smith, Kristen Gremillion and others, goosefoots have a history of culinary use dating back to 4000 BC or earlier, when pitseed goosefoot (C. berlandieri) was a staple crop in the Native American Eastern Agricultural Complex, and white goosefoot was apparently used by the Ertebølle culture of Europe. Members of the eastern Yamnaya culture also harvested white goosefoot as an apparent cereal substitute to round out an otherwise mostly meat and dairy diet c. 3500–2500 BC.

There is increased interest in particular in goosefoot seeds today, which are suitable as part of a gluten-free diet. Quinoa oil, extracted from the seeds of C. quinoa, has similar properties, but is superior in quality, to corn oil. Oil of chenopodium is extracted from the seeds of epazote, which is not in this genus anymore. Shagreen leather was produced in the past using the small, hard goosefoot seeds. C. album was one of the main model organisms for the molecular biological study of chlorophyllase.

Goosefoot pollen, in particular of the widespread and usually abundant C. album, is an allergen to many people and a common cause of hay fever. The same species, as well as some others, have seeds which are able to persist for years in the soil seed bank. Many goosefoot species are thus significant weeds, and some have become invasive species.

In Australia, the larger Chenopodium species are among the plants called "bluebushes". According to the 1889 book The Useful Native Plants of Australia, Chenopodium auricomum "is another of the salt-bushes, which, besides being invaluable food for stock, can be eaten by man. All plants of the Natural Order Chenopodiaceae (Salsolacese) are more or less useful in this respect." The book goes on to give the following account from the Journal de la Ferme et des Maisons de campagne:

We have recently gathered an abundant harvest of leaves from two or three plants growing in our garden. These leaves were put into boiling water to blanch them, and they were then cooked as an ordinary dish of spinach, with this difference in favour of the new plant, that there was no occasion to take away the threads which are so disagreeable in chicory, sorrel, and ordinary spinach. We partook of this dish with relish—the flavour—analogous to spinach, had something in it more refined, less grassy in taste. The cultivation is easy: sow the seed in April (October) in a well-manured bed, for the plant is greedy; water it. The leaves may be gathered from the time the plant attains 50 centimetres (say 20 inches) in height. They grow up again quickly. In less than eight days afterwards another gathering may take place, and so on to the end of the year.

Chualar, California is named after a Native American term for a goosefoot abundant in the region, probably the California goosefoot (Blitum californicum).

Ecology
Certain species grow in large thickets, providing cover for small animals. Goosefoot foliage is used as food by the caterpillars of certain Lepidoptera. The seeds are eaten by many birds, such as the yellowhammer (Emberiza citrinella) of Europe or the white-winged fairy-wren (Malurus leucopterus) of Australia. Goosefoot pathogens include the positive-sense ssRNA virusesapple stem grooving virus, sowbane mosaic virus and tobacco necrosis virus.

Systematics
The genus Chenopodium was described by Carl Linnaeus in 1753 (In: Species Plantarum, Vol. 1, p. 218–222). Type species is Chenopodium album. This generic name is derived from the particular shape of the leaf, which is similar to a goose's foot: from Greek χήν (chen), "goose" and πούς (pous), "foot" or ποδίον (podion), "little foot".

In its traditional circumscription, Chenopodium comprised about 170 species. Phylogenetic research revealed, that the genus was highly polyphyletic and did not reflect how species were naturally related. Therefore, a new classification was necessary. Mosyakin & Clemants (2002, 2008) separated the glandular species as genus Dysphania (which includes epazote) and Teloxys in tribe Dysphanieae. Fuentes-Bazan et al. (2012) separated many species to genera Blitum (in tribe Anserineae), Chenopodiastrum, Lipandra, and Oxybasis (like Chenopodium in tribe Atripliceae). They included Rhagodia and Einadia in Chenopodium.

Selected species

 Chenopodium acicularis
 Chenopodium acuminatum Willd.
 Chenopodium albescens
 Chenopodium album – white goosefoot, nickel greens, dungweed, bathua, chandali, chandaliya, fat hen, lamb's quarters, pigweed
 Chenopodium album ssp. amaranticolor
 Chenopodium allanii 
 Chenopodium arizonicum  – Arizona goosefoot
 Chenopodium atrovirens – dark goosefoot, pinyon goosefoot
 Chenopodium aureum  – golden goosefoot
 Chenopodium auricomiforme
 Chenopodium auricomum – Queensland bluebush
 Chenopodium baccatum (Syn. Rhagodia baccata) 
 Chenopodium benthamii (Syn.: Rhagodia latifolia)
 Chenopodium berlandieri – pitseed goosefoot, southern huauzontle, lambsquarters
 Chenopodium berlandieri ssp. nuttalliae (Saff.) H.D.Wilson & Heiser
 Chenopodium berlandieri var. bushianum
 Chenopodium berlandieri var. zschackii
 Chenopodium brandegeeae – Brandegee's goosefoot
 Chenopodium bryoniifolium Bunge – Korean goosefoot
 Chenopodium bushianum – village goosefoot
 Chenopodium candolleanum (Syn.: Rhagodia candolleana)
 Chenopodium curvispicatum
 Chenopodium cycloides – sandhill goosefoot
 Chenopodium desertorum – desert goosefoot
 Chenopodium desertorum ssp. anidiophyllum
 Chenopodium desertorum ssp. desertorum
 Chenopodium desertorum ssp. microphyllum
 Chenopodium desertorum ssp. rectum
 Chenopodium desertorum ssp. virosum
 Chenopodium desiccatum – narrowleaf goosefoot
 Chenopodium detestans – New Zealand fish-guts plant
 Chenopodium drummondii (Syn.: Rhagodia drummondii)
 Chenopodium eastwoodiae – Eastwood's goosefoot
 Chenopodium eremaea (Syn.: Rhagodia eremaea)
 Chenopodium erosum R.Br.
 Chenopodium ficifolium – fig-leaved goosefoot, small goosefoot
 Chenopodium flabellifolium – San Martin Island goosefoot, flabelliform goosefoot
 Chenopodium foggii – Fogg's goosefoot
 Chenopodium formosanum – red quinoa, djulis
 Chenopodium fremontii – Fremont's goosefoot
 Chenopodium giganteum D.Don – tree spinach
 Chenopodium gigantospermum 
 Chenopodium hians
 Chenopodium howellii  – Howell's goosefoot
 Chenopodium iljinii
 Chenopodium incanum – mealy goosefoot
 Chenopodium incognitum
 Chenopodium lenticulare
 Chenopodium leptophyllum – narrowleaf goosefoot
 Chenopodium lineatum – Mono goosefoot
 Chenopodium littoreum – coastal goosefoot
 Chenopodium luteum – yellow goosefoot
 Chenopodium missouriense – Missouri goosefoot (sometimes considered a variety of C. album)
 Chenopodium neomexicanum  – New Mexico goosefoot
 Chenopodium nevadense  – Nevada goosefoot
 Chenopodium nitrariaceum (F.Muell.) F.Muell. ex Benth. – nitre goosefoot
 Chenopodium nitens – shiny goosefoot
 Chenopodium nutans (Syn.: Rhagodia nutans)
 Chenopodium nuttalliae – huauzontle, chia roja, quelite
 Chenopodium oahuense – Āheahea (Hawaii)
 Chenopodium obscurum
 Chenopodium opulifolium Schrad. ex W.D.J.Koch – grey goosefoot
 Chenopodium pallescens  – pallid goosefoot
 Chenopodium pallidicaule – kañiwa, "cañahua"
 Chenopodium palmeri – Palmer's goosefoot
 Chenopodium pamiricum
 Chenopodium parabolicum (Syn.: Rhagodia parabolica)
 Chenopodium parryi – Parry's goosefoot
 Chenopodium petiolare 
 Chenopodium polygonoides 
 Chenopodium pratericola Rydb. – pale goosefoot, desert goosefoot, narrowleaf goosefoot
 Chenopodium preissii (Syn. Rhagodia preissii)
 Chenopodium probstii Aellen
 Chenopodium purpurascens – purple goosefoot
 Chenopodium quinoa – quinoa
 Chenopodium retusum
 Chenopodium robertianum (Syn.: Rhagodia hastata)
 Chenopodium salinum – Rocky Mountain goosefoot
 Chenopodium sandersii – Sander's goosefoot
 Chenopodium simpsonii – Simpson's goosefoot
 Chenopodium sonorense – Sonoran goosefoot
 Chenopodium spinescens (Syn. Rhagodia spinescens)
 Chenopodium standleyanum – Standley's goosefoot
 Chenopodium strictum Roth
 Chenopodium subglabrum – smooth arid goosefoot, smooth goosefoot
 Chenopodium suecicum – green goosefoot
 Chenopodium triandrum (Syn.: Rhagodia triandra)
 Chenopodium trigonon (Syn.: Einadia trigonos)
 Chenopodium truncatum
 Chenopodium twisselmannii – Twisselmann's goosefoot, high meadow goosefoot
 Chenopodium ulicinum
 Chenopodium × variabile (C. album × C. berlandieri)
 Chenopodium vulvaria – stinking goosefoot, notchweed
 Chenopodium wahlii – Wahl's goosefoot
 Chenopodium watsonii – Watson's goosefoot
 Chenopodium wilsonii (Syn.: Rhagodia crassifolia)

Excluded species
 Blitum (12 species):
 Blitum bonus-henricus – Good King Henry, perennial goosefoot, poor-man's asparagus, Lincolnshire spinach, markery
 Blitum californicum – California goosefoot, Indian lettuce
 Blitum capitatum – strawberry blite, blite goosefoot, strawberry goosefoot, strawberry spinach, Indian paint, Indian ink
 Blitum virgatum  (Syn. Chenopodium foliosum) – leafy goosefoot
 Chenopodiastrum (5 species):
 Chenopodiastrum murale – nettle-leaved goosefoot
 Chenopodiastrum simplex – giantseed goosefoot
 Dysphania (about 43 glandular species, as C. botrys, C. carinatum, C. cristatum, C. melanocarpum, C. multifidium, C. pumilio and more)
 Lipandra (one species):
 Lipandra polysperma – many-seeded goosefoot
 Oxybasis (5 species):
 Oxybasis chenopodioides – small red goosefoot, saltmarsh goosefoot
 Oxybasis glauca – oak-leaved goosefoot
 Oxybasis rubra – red goosefoot, coastblite goosefoot
 Oxybasis urbica – upright goosefoot
 Teloxys (one species):
 Teloxys aristata
 Suaeda australis – austral seablite (as C. australe, C. insulare)

Fossil record
†Chenopodium wetzleri  fossil seeds of the Chattian stage, Oligocene, are known from the Oberleichtersbach Formation in the Rhön Mountains, central Germany.

References

Further reading
 

 
Amaranthaceae genera
Taxa named by Carl Linnaeus
Chenopodioideae